Nadeen Osama El Sayed (  ) is an Egyptian model and beauty pageant titleholder who was crowned Miss Egypt 2016 and She represented Egypt at Miss World 2016 pageant in the United States.

Early life
Nadeen Osama El Sayed was born in Cairo. She graduated last year from Nermein Ismael American school "NIAS" and now studies Business Administration at the British University in Cairo. She grew up with two sisters, Merna, the oldest and Reem, the youngest. She also has another baby sister.

Pageantry

Miss Egypt 2016
Nadeen was crowned Miss Egypt 2016 on 18 September 2016. As Miss Egypt World 2016.

Miss World 2016
Nadeen represented Egypt in the Miss World 2016 pageant but Unplaced.

References

External links

1998 births
Living people
Models from Cairo
Miss Egypt winners
Miss World 2016 delegates